John Meade may refer to:

 Sir John Meade, 1st Baronet (1642–1707), Irish barrister, judge and politician, Member of the Parliament of Ireland 1689–1707
 John Meade, 1st Earl of Clanwilliam (1744–1800), Irish peer and Member of the Parliament of Ireland for Banagher 1764–67
 John Meade (British Army officer) (c. 1775–1849), Member of the UK Parliament for County Down 1805–12
 John Meade, 7th Earl of Clanwilliam (1919–2009), Anglo-Irish nobleman